The 2012 Doncaster Metropolitan Borough Council election took place on 3 May 2012 to elect one third of Doncaster Metropolitan Borough Council in South Yorkshire, England. This was on the same day as other 2012 United Kingdom local elections.

The Labour Party retained its control of the council with an increased majority after increasing its vote share by 21.7% and gaining three seats from the Liberal Democrats and five from various independents. The Conservatives held the three seats it was defending with a reduced vote share. After the election, the composition of the council was:
Labour 50
Conservative 9
Liberal Democrats 3
Others 1

Result

Ward results
The results in each ward are shown below. Changes are compared with the previous election in 2008. Spoilt ballots are not included in the below results.

Adwick

Armthorpe

Askern Spa

Balby

Bentley

Bessacarr & Cantley

Central

Conisbrough & Denaby

Edenthorpe, Kirk Sandall & Barnby Dun

Edlington & Warmsworth

Finningley

Great North Road

Hatfield

Mexborough

Rossington

Sprotbrough

Stainforth & Moorends

Thorne

Torne Valley

Town Moor

Wheatley

Mayoral referendum
Alongside the council election, and election took place to decide whether to have an elected mayor in Doncaster. Doncaster was one of the two cities on the night to vote 'Yes'.

References

2012 English local elections
2012
2010s in South Yorkshire